The Xian Ni (Chinese: , Xiānnī)  (formerly Konstantin Stanyukovich) is a Dmitriy Furmanov-class (project 302MK, BiFa129M) Chinese river cruise ship, cruising on the Yangtze River. The ship was built by VEB Elbewerften Boizenburg/Roßlau at their shipyard in Boizenburg, East Germany, and entered service in 1994.  Her home port is currently Nantong.

Features
The ship has two restaurants: Golden Pavilion Dining Room on the Boat deck and Emperor's Dining Hall (176 places) on the Upper deck, two bars:  Misty Observation Lounge/library (Boat deck) and Lotus Bar on the Upper deck, a conference hall which can seat up to 220 people, a sauna, and a souvenir shop.

See also
 List of river cruise ships

References

External links

Project 302 ships (PDF, by Y. L. Smirnov; 1,5 MB) 

1991 ships
River cruise ships